Fu Zhensong (1872–1953), also known by his courtesy name Fu Qiankun, was a grandmaster of Wudangquan martial arts. He was best known as one of the famed "Five Northern Tigers," and a third-generation master of Baguazhang who founded Fu Style Baguazhang. He was also a soldier and a supporter of Sun Yat-sen.

Early life
Fu Zhensong was born in Mapo village, Biyang County, Henan province, China.  When he was 16 years old, he joined his village's newly created martial arts school, where he studied under Chen Yanxi from the nearby Chen village, an 8th generation disciple of Chen family of taijiquan. He also learned from Chia Feng Ming (also written in English sometimes as Chia Chi-shan or Jia Feng Meng), a top student of the founder of baguazhang, Grandmaster Dong Haichuan.   After nine years of training, his teachers encouraged him to move to Beijing to learn more. When he moved to Beijing, Fu continued his studies of baguazhang with Ma Gui and Cheng Tinghua, both first generation disciples of Dong Haichuan.

In 1900 he moved back to his home village to teach.  He became well known in that part of China for defeating a large gang of bandits that attacked his village; he did so armed with a metal pole.  In 1911, Fu Chen-Sung became a caravan guard/body guard in Shandong and Henan at the request of the Kai Kung Hsin Shan Protection Service.

After the Xinhai Revolution of 1911, Fu traveled to Fu Chou, Cheng Chou, as well as Shan Si Province, and beyond. In 1913, Fu was hired by the Revolutionary Army as a martial arts instructor, holding this post for a few years.  During those years he met the Wudang grandmaster Sung Wei-I in Liao Ning Province. Fu learned Wudang sword, "lightning palm" and “rocket fist" from Sung.  These elements later became part of Fu's forms. According to Lin Chao Zhen, Fu created the Dragon form baguazhang and LiangYi Chuan (“harmonized opposites boxing") after he studied with Sung Wei-I.

Military career
In 1920 Fu joined the central army. The then Brigade Commander (later General), Li Jinglin (“Miracle sword" Li) made Fu head of the 100 person strong martial arts company after he demonstrated tiger fist, leopard fist, connected fist, bagua “cyclone", broadsword and bagua “four sided" spear. Li Jinglin had also learned sword from Sung Wei-I, and so he taught Fu further sword techniques.  In 1926 the company transferred to Beijing.  During a martial arts demonstration, “God spear" Li used his famous spear and Fu used his “four faced" bagua spear in a friendly bout. The match ended in a draw. This increased Fu's fame and both men exchanged their knowledge of spear tactics. Fu Chen Sung was married to Han Kun Ru, who practiced the spear and had a powerful technique. Her father was also a famous kung fu master in China. 
 
In Beijing, Fu met Sun Lu-t'ang, Yang Chengfu, and many other skilled practitioners, with whom he exchanged knowledge. This exchange continued when the Central Guoshu Institute (Central Martial Arts Academy) was founded in Nanjing. After heavy competition, Fu Chen Sung was made Chief Instructor of baguazhang, emphasizing in his teachings fast precise footwork and waist strength. It was here that he taught Sun Lu-t'ang the Wudang sword and in exchange, Sun Lu-t'ang taught him the Sun-style of Xingyiquan and T'ai chi ch'uan.

In late 1928 or 1929, at General Li Jinglin's urging, the Central Gymnasium sent Fu south to teach at the Guangxi and Guangzhou provincial school the Liang Kuang Kuo Shu Kuan (the Two Kuang's Martial Arts School.)  This school was located in Guangzhou (Canton). Fu became the school's director. Along with Fu, four others were also sent to the south.  They were (probably) Gu Ruzhang, Wang Shao-Chou, Wan Laisheng, and Li Hsien-Wu. They were all constantly being challenged by southern Chinese martial artists, but always beat all challengers. They thus earned the respectful nickname, the “Five Northern Tigers". Fu Zhensong, Gu Ruzhang, and Wai Laisheng remained in Canton, and spread the Northern styles throughout the province.

In 1937 the Second Sino-Japanese War broke out and the Provincial Martial Arts Academy and the Chin Woo Athletic Association schools were closed down. Fu moved his family further into the countryside for safety, and traveled around the south teaching the Chinese army troops. After the war ended in 1945, Fu began to teach in various schools in Guangzhou. He devoted his life to developing the Fu Style Wudangquan.

In 1953, martial arts exhibitions were held in Canton Cultural Park. Thousands of people packed the park, and crowds of people blocked all entrances. Fu Chen Sung demonstrated the dragon form. After his first demonstration, the cheering crowd called for encores, and Fu returned to perform the form, faster and faster. Of this event, a local newspaper said afterwards “words could not describe the speed with which he moved." This exertion overcame him, and later that night Fu died at the local hospital. He believed in constant innovation and continual improvement. The forms he developed express this, incorporating the most useful and practical principles of other styles, and progress from simple to advanced.

Lineage

Baguazhang
Dong Haichuan developed pa kua after learning circle walking from the Complete Reality Taoist school. Fu spent 8 years learning pa kua from Jia Feng Meng, then 3 years in Beijing learning from Yin Fu's top student Ma Gui, and from Cheng Tinghua at the same time. All were first generation students of Grandmaster Dong Hai Chuan.

Wudang Sword
Fu may have studied sword under Sung Wei-I, and definitely learned from Li Jinglin.  Fu taught Sun Lu-t'ang the sword in Nanjing, and in exchange Sun taught him Xingyiquan.

Taijiquan
Fu learned Chen-style t'ai chi ch'uan as a youth, while simultaneously learning baguazhang.  He later learned Sun-style t'ai chi ch'uan from Sun Lu-t'ang and Yang-style t'ai chi ch'uan from Yang Chengfu.  From all these styles he synthesized his own form, and balanced left and right.

Xingyiquan
Fu learned Xingyiquan from Sun Lu-t'ang in exchange for having taught him the sword in Nanjing.

References

Bibliography
 Lin, Chao Zhen (2010). Fu Zhen Song's Dragon Bagua Zhang. Blue Snake Books. .
 Miller, Dan (1992). "The Pa Kua Chang of Fu Chen-Sung". Pa Kua Chang Journal 2 (6).
 Liang Shou-Yu, Yang Jwing-Ming, Wu Wen-Ching (1994). Baguazhang. YMAA. p. 40. .
 Kirchhoff, Tommy (December 2004). "Evasive Fu Style Bagua Zhang". Inside Kung-Fu: 74–78.
 Fu Yonghui and Lai Zonghong (1998). Fu Style Dragon Form Eight Trigrams Palms. Smiling Tiger Martial Arts. .
 Kwan, Dr. Paul W.L. (April 1978). "The New Wu Shu". Black Belt.
 Lukitsh, Jean (October 1992). "A Wushu Dream Comes True". Inside Kung-Fu 2 (3): 34–39, 76.
 Smalheiser, Marvin (April 1996). "Fu Style T'ai Chi and Bagua". T'ai Chi.
 Smalheiser, Marvin (June 1996). "The Power of Mind and Energy". T'ai Chi.
 Smalheiser, Marvin (December 2000). "The Power of Yin/Yang Changes". T'ai Chi.
 Allen, Frank; Tina Chunna Zhang (2007). The Whirling Circles of Ba Gua Zhang: The Art and Legends of the Eight Trigram Palm. Blue Snake Books. pp. 48–51. .
 Cobb, Nathan (13 March 2001). "Grande Dame of Wu Dang". Boston Globe. Retrieved 22 January 2010.
 Pa Kwa Chang Journal (volume 1, #3; volume 2, #6; volume 5, #2; and volume 6, #6)
 Pa Kua Chang Journal
 Fu Yonghui and Lai Zonghong (translated by Joseph Crandall), Fu Style Dragon Form Eight Trigrams Palms
 Victor Fu’s website, 3rd generation Fu family internal styles.
 Qiang-Ya Liang’s site.  Qiang-Ya Liang is one of two last living disciples of Fu Chen Sung.

External links 
 Fu style schools worldwide

Chinese baguazhang practitioners
Chinese military personnel of World War II
Chinese swordsmanship
Qing dynasty Taoists
Republic of China Taoists
1953 deaths
1872 births
Chinese tai chi practitioners
Chinese xingyiquan practitioners
Sportspeople from Henan
People from Zhumadian